Lyndon Loos (born 31 July 1966) is a Sri Lankan former first-class cricketer who played for Galle Cricket Club.

References

External links
 

1966 births
Living people
Sri Lankan cricketers
Galle Cricket Club cricketers
Place of birth missing (living people)